Fernando de Errázuriz y Martínez de Aldunate (June 1, 1777 – August 16, 1841), also known as Fernando Errázuriz Aldunate, was a Chilean political figure. He served as provisional president of Chile in 1831.

Biography 
Errázuriz was born in Santiago, the son of Francisco Javier de Errázuriz y Madariaga and of María Rosa Aldunate y Guerrero Carrera. He became a lawyer and participated in the independence movement in Chile. On October 2, 1801 he married María del Carmen Sotomayor Elzo, with whom he had 8 children.

Chilean independence process  (1810–1823) 
In the First Government Junta (open council 1810 ), he was governor of the open council of 1810.

During the period of the Patria Vieja, he was elected deputy for Rancagua in the First National Congress of 1811.

War of Independence of Chile
He participated in the War of Independence and suffered persecution during the Spanish conquest between 1814 and 1817.  He regained his freedom after the patriot victory at Chacabuco on February 12, 1817.

During the period of Patria Nueva, from February 12 of 1817 until January 28 of 1823, he was deputy for Rancagua.

On the morning of January 28, 1823, an open council meeting was convened to ask for the abdication of the Supreme Director Bernardo O'Higgins. The Government Junta was formed by Agustín de Eyzaguirre, Errázuriz and José Miguel Infante.

On December 12 of 1823, he was elected president of the Congress, which began to be bicameral.

In 1823 he was senator for Santiago and President of the Senate; as such, was appointed supreme director delegated January 3 of 1824.

He was senator of Santiago again between 1831 and 1834.

President of Chile 
Provisional President of Chile: He served as president of the Provincial Assembly of the Santiago in October 19 of 1826 and November 26 of 1827. He was appointed interim president of the congress of plenipotentiaries in March 1830.

Provisional President of Chile: On March 8 of 1831, due to the resignation and subsequent death of José Tomás Ovalle was appointed accidental vice president or provisional president until March 22. That day, he took the office, which was maintained until  September 18 of the same year. Then he was succeeded by José Joaquín Prieto, who had been elected in the convened presidential vote.

Cabinet

See also

Jose Martinez de Aldunate

References

External links
Genealogical chart of Errázuriz family 

1777 births
1841 deaths
F
People from Santiago
Chilean people of Basque descent
Presidents of Chile
People of the Chilean Civil War of 1829–30
Candidates for President of Chile